Calcium-independent phospholipase A2-gamma is an enzyme that in humans is encoded by the PNPLA8 gene.

References

Further reading